Home Media Magazine was a trade publication that covered various aspects of the home entertainment industry, most notably home video distribution via VHS, DVD, Blu-ray, and digital copy. The magazine also covered news relating to consumer electronics, video games, home video distributors and various forms of digital distribution of movie and TV content.

History and profile
The magazine was founded in 1979 and was known as Video Store Magazine until January 2005, when it became Home Media Retailing.  To further its consumer focus, the magazine dropped "Retailing" at the beginning of 2007. In 2014 the magazine's print edition was reduced to biweekly and in 2015, to monthly; at the same time, the publication increased its web presence through a daily e-newsletter and frequent "breaking news" alerts. HM also published frequent special issues, such as special reports on 4K Ultra HD, Vidity, and UltraViolet; rankings of the top women in home entertainment, key digital drivers, and leading disruptors; and, in 2011, a salute to executives in home entertainment under the age of 40.

The magazine was based in Santa Ana, California, and was a subsidiary of the Questex Media Group.

In July 2006, HM launched a consumer magazine called Agent DVD, a semi-regular periodical focusing on home entertainment news. The first issue debuted at the 2006 Comic Con International in San Diego, California, and focused on titles and news that would appeal to convention-goers. The consumer magazine was later rebranded as Home Media Insider and offered only in digital form. Additionally, Home Media Magazine presented annual awards covering the best DVD and Blu-ray products. Questex ceased production of Home Media Magazine after the December 2017 issue.

Media Play News
In January 2018, the core team responsible for producing the Home Media Magazine print and online properties returned with an independent operation named Media Play News that offers an expanded home entertainment focus from its predecessor, covering not just Blu-ray Disc and DVD but also transactional video-on-demand (both streaming and purchase) as well as subscription streaming.

As of December 2022, Thomas K. Arnold sits as the publisher and editorial director of Media Play News, while Stephanie Prange is the editor-in-chief.

The new publication publishes a monthly magazine in both print and digital versions and maintains a website, a daily newsletter, reviews, and breaking news alerts.

Seemingly, the new publication acts both as a curator and an aggregator of content for the home entertainment industry, as it distributes its various forms of content using multiple channels—both digital and print. Currently, Media Plays News is used and cited by retailers, media outlets, technology reporters, and consumers in the home entertainment industry.

Media Play News often uses major conventions, festivals, and other industry events as an additional channel to distribute its print publication.

Since 2018, Media Play News has been publishing a curated list of the top forty influential business executives in the home entertainment industry. The list is titled "40 Under 40 in Home Entertainment".

Media Plays News produces an annual awards contest titled the "Home Entertainment Media Play Awards". The awards are all-embracing to the home entertainment industry, covering dozens of categories.

Notes and references

Notes

References

External links
 Media Play News website

Entertainment magazines published in the United States
Entertainment trade magazines
Magazines established in 1979
Magazines published in California
Mass media in Orange County, California
Science and technology magazines published in the United States
Weekly magazines published in the United States